Hesperorhipis mirabilis is a species of metallic wood-boring beetle in the family Buprestidae. It is found in North America.

Subspecies
These two subspecies belong to the species Hesperorhipis mirabilis:
 Hesperorhipis mirabilis albopennis Knull, 1951
 Hesperorhipis mirabilis mirabilis Knull, 1937

References

Further reading

 
 
 

Buprestidae
Articles created by Qbugbot
Beetles described in 1937